Death and Diplomacy is an original novel written by Dave Stone and based on the long-running British science fiction television series Doctor Who. It features the Seventh Doctor, Bernice, Chris, Roz and the first appearance of Jason.

External links

1996 British novels
1996 science fiction novels
Virgin New Adventures
Novels by Dave Stone
British science fiction novels
Seventh Doctor novels
Fiction set in 2011